Wagnney Silva Fabiano-Santos (born July 14, 1975) is a Brazilian mixed martial artist.  He is best known for fighting in the WEC, as well as for the Toronto Dragons of the International Fight League and is the former IFL Featherweight Champion.

Background
Wagnney's mix of his proficient striking ability and solid ground game is helping him grow into a well rounded and accomplished mixed martial artist. Wagnney has trained in Brazil with teammates under Antônio Rodrigo Nogueira and has been linked to Renzo Gracie's Academy. He is also known to have coached Georges St-Pierre in Brazilian Jiu Jitsu.

APEX
On October 14 of 2006, Fabiano stepped in to face off against Jeff Curran. Both fighters seemed overly tentative on the feet, and the fight largely consisted of grappling. Fabiano landed a few takedowns but offered little offence on the ground, being unable to improve his position. Curran came out firing in the third as he landed some good shots before they hit the canvas again. Even with Curran's third round, it appeared Fabiano would be ahead on takedowns on the scorecards. However the decision was announced, contentiously, in favor of Jeff Curran by split decision.

International Fight League
After losing for the first time in his career via controversial split decision to Jeff Curran, Fabiano ventured into the International Fight League. In his career there, he enjoyed four straight wins showcasing notable submission offence by ending each fight via submission in the first round. He then fought LC Davis and became IFL Featherweight Champion with a submission victory by armbar near the close of the first round. This was after dropping down to 145-pounds after defeating John Gunderson at 155-pounds in his previous IFL World Grand Prix fight. The victory over Gunderson was supposed to set up Fabiano for a match with the previously unbeaten Chris Horodecki, but Fabiano dropped down to 145-pounds in order to fight for the Featherweight Championship.

Wagnney Fabiano's next bout, and first IFL Featherweight title defense, came against Shad Lierley on April 4, 2008 at; IFL - New Blood, New Battles 2. In what was dubbed as an archetypal fight between wrestler and Brazilian jiu-jitsu expert, Fabiano won by knocking out Lierly at 0:37 of the first round. Fabiano displayed impressive standup skills, utilizing good leg kicks and bodyshots. Near the end of the round he threw a left jab which Lierly parried partially, but connected a flush right hook to knock out the challenger convincingly and conclude his first title defence. It also become his last and only defence of the IFL Featherweight championship as the company ceased operations on July 31, 2008.

World Extreme Cagefighting
On August 22 of 2008, the WEC announced that it had signed Fabiano. He was the last remaining champion from the International Fight League.

Fabiano was scheduled to fight undefeated WEC newcomer Erik Koch on October 10, 2009 at WEC 43., but Koch was forced to withdraw due to an undisclosed injury while training, he was replaced by Mackens Semerzier.
Fabiano was defeated by Semerzier by submission via triangle choke in the first round, ending his eight-fight win streak. Fabiano found himself on the wrong end of the Sherdog.com Upset of the Year as a result of that submission loss.

Fabiano was expected to face Frank Gomez on January 10, 2010 at WEC 46. However, Gomez had been forced out of the bout with an injury.  Fabiano instead faced Clint Godfrey, winning his bantamweight debut via unanimous decision.

Fabiano/Gomez eventually took place on June 20, 2010 at WEC 49. Fabiano won the fight via unanimous decision.

Fabiano was expected to face former WEC Bantamweight Champion Brian Bowles at WEC 52.  However, Bowles was forced off the card with an injury, and replaced by Joseph Benavidez.  Fabiano was defeated by Benavidez via second round submission.

Despite going 4-2 in the WEC, Fabiano was cut by Zuffa after his WEC 52 loss and the WEC/UFC merger. Following his release, Fabiano tried out for The Ultimate Fighter 14 at the open tryouts in Newark, N.J. on March 21, 2011.

Bellator MMA
After almost 2 years away from the sport, Fabiano returned to MMA to compete in the Bellator Season Seven Featherweight tournament, He faced Akop Stepanyan in the Quarterfinals at Bellator 76 and won the bout via first round armbar submission.

On November 9, 2012 Fabiano took on Rad Martinez at Bellator 80 in the Semifinals losing via unanimous decision.

Personal life
Wagnney Fabiano is married to Rachel Alves Romero dos Santos since 1998 and the couple has two daughters. The oldest, Joy Melody Romero dos Santos, and their youngest, Faith Melody Romero dos Santos.

Championships and accomplishments
International Fight League
IFL Featherweight Championship (One time; First; Last)
IFL 2007 Featherweight Grand Prix Champion
TKO Major League MMA
UCC/TKO World Super-Lightweight Championship (One time)

Mixed martial arts record

|-
| Win
| align=center| 16–4
| Edinelson Cordeiro
| Submission (armbar)
| Shooto Brazil 52
| 
| align=center| 1
| align=center| 3:50
| Rio de Janeiro, Brazil
| 
|-
| Loss
| align=center| 15–4
| Rad Martinez
| Decision (unanimous)
| Bellator 80
| 
| align=center| 3
| align=center| 5:00
| Hollywood, Florida, United States
| <small>Bellator Season 7 Featherweight Tournament Semifinal
|-
| Win
| align=center| 15–3
| Akop Stepanyan
| Submission (armbar)
| Bellator 76
| 
| align=center| 1
| align=center| 3:24
| Windsor, Ontario, Canada
| <small>Bellator Season 7 Featherweight Tournament Quarterfinal
|-
| Loss
| align=center| 14–3
| Joseph Benavidez
| Submission (guillotine choke)
| WEC 52
| 
| align=center| 2
| align=center| 2:45
| Las Vegas, Nevada, United States
| 
|-
| Win
| align=center| 14–2
| Frank Gomez
| Decision (unanimous)
| WEC 49
| 
| align=center| 3
| align=center| 5:00
| Edmonton, Alberta, Canada
| 
|-
| Win
| align=center| 13–2
| Clint Godfrey
| Decision (unanimous)
| WEC 46
| 
| align=center| 3
| align=center| 5:00
| Sacramento, California, United States
| Bantamweight debut
|-
| Loss
| align=center| 12–2
| Mackens Semerzier
| Submission (triangle choke)
| WEC 43
| 
| align=center| 1
| align=center| 2:14
| San Antonio, Texas, United States
|  2010 Sherdog upset of the year
|-
| Win
| align=center| 12–1
| Fredson Paixão
| Decision (unanimous)
| WEC 40
| 
| align=center| 3
| align=center| 5:00
| Chicago, Illinois, United States
| 
|-
| Win
| align=center| 11–1
| Akitoshi Tamura
| Submission (arm-triangle choke)
| WEC 37: Torres vs. Tapia
| 
| align=center| 3
| align=center| 4:48
| Las Vegas, Nevada, United States
| 
|-
| Win
| align=center| 10–1
| Shad Lierley
| KO (punch)
| IFL: New Blood, New Battles 2
| 
| align=center| 1
| align=center| 0:37
| East Rutherford, New Jersey, United States
| Defended IFL Featherweight Championship
|-
| Win
| align=center| 9–1
| LC Davis
| Submission (armbar)
| IFL - World Grand Prix Finals
| 
| align=center| 1
| align=center| 3:38
| Uncasville, Connecticut, United States
| Became First IFL Featherweight Champion
|-
| Win
| align=center| 8–1
| John Gunderson
| Submission (guillotine choke)
| IFL - World Grand Prix Semifinals
| 
| align=center| 2
| align=center| 1:53
| Chicago, Illinois, United States
| 
|-
| Win
| align=center| 7–1
| Erik Owings
| Submission  (armbar)
| IFL - Las Vegas
| 
| align=center| 1
| align=center| 0:58
| Las Vegas, Nevada, United States
| 
|-
| Win
| align=center| 6–1
| Cam Ward
| Submission (arm-triangle choke)
| IFL - Connecticut
| 
| align=center| 1
| align=center| 3:24
| Uncasville, Connecticut, United States
| 
|-
| Win
| align=center| 5–1
| Ian Loveland
| Submission (arm-triangle choke)
| IFL - Atlanta
| 
| align=center| 1
| align=center| 0:59
| Atlanta, Georgia, United States
| 
|-
| Loss
| align=center| 4–1
| Jeff Curran
| Decision (split)
| APEX: A Night Of Champions
| 
| align=center| 3
| align=center| 5:00
| Gatineau, Quebec, Canada
| 
|-
| Win
| align=center| 4–0
| Bao Quach
| KO (head kick)
| APEX: Evolution
| 
| align=center| 1
| align=center| 4:50
| Gatineau, Quebec, Canada
| 
|-
| Win
| align=center| 3–0
| Matt Fiordirosa
| Decision (unanimous)
| Freedom Fights: Canada vs. USA
| 
| align=center| 3
| align=center| 5:00
| Hull, Quebec, Canada
| 
|-
| Win
| align=center| 2–0
| Tommy Lee
| Submission (arm-triangle choke)
| TKO 16: Infernal
| 
| align=center| 1
| align=center| 2:46
| Quebec City, Quebec, Canada
| Won TKO World Super-Lightweight Championship
|-
| Win
| align=center| 1–0
| Ali Nestor Charles
| Decision (unanimous)
| UCC 1: The New Beginning
| 
| align=center| 2
| align=center| 10:00
| Montreal, Quebec, Canada
| Won UCC Lightweight MMA World Championship

Awards
fifth-Degree Black Belt in Brazilian Jiu Jitsu under Wendell Alexander and André Pederneiras.
Has also trained in Brazilian Jiu Jitsu under Renzo Gracie and Carlos Gracie (Jr.).
Member of 1997 BJJ World Champions team Nova Uniao.
Won five (5) state titles.
Three-time Brazilian National Champion.
Brazilian National Teams Champion.
Won Pan-Am '95.
Third Place in the world in Mundials '98.
2004 Arnold Gracie Worlds Pro Division 2nd Place.
2005 ADCC Quarter Finalist.
Won the NAGA, Grapplers Quest, and the Brazilian Abu Dhabi trials.

References

External links
 
 
 
 

Living people
Brazilian male mixed martial artists
Brazilian practitioners of Brazilian jiu-jitsu
Bantamweight mixed martial artists
Featherweight mixed martial artists
Mixed martial artists utilizing Brazilian jiu-jitsu
Sportspeople from Rio de Janeiro (city)
1975 births
People awarded a black belt in Brazilian jiu-jitsu